The Sopkarga mammoth, alternately spelled Sopkarginsky mammoth, and informally called Zhenya, after the nickname of its discoverer, is a woolly mammoth carcass found in October 2012. The Moscow News refers to it as the best preserved mammoth find in the past 100 years.

The remains are those of a male, aged 15 to 16 years, who died c. 48,000 years ago.

This find is the best-preserved of its kind since another mammoth was unearthed in 1901 near the Beryozovka River in Yakutia. This makes Zhenya the second-best preserved mammoth ever found.

Over the course of a week, the frozen carcass was extracted using steam, axes, and picks. It was then transported by helicopter to Dudinka, the capital of Taymyr, and placed in an ice chamber.

Zhenya's hump appears to be composed of fat, similar to a camel's hump.

The remains were found by 11-year-old Yevgeny Salinder who lives near the station. His nickname is "Zhenya".

See also
List of mammoth specimens
Adams mammoth
Jarkov Mammoth
Lyuba Mammoth
Yuka Mammoth
Yukagir Mammoth

References 

Prehistoric elephants
Pleistocene proboscideans
Fossils of Russia
2012 in paleontology
2012 in Russia
2012 archaeological discoveries